Beinn a’ Ghlò is a Scottish mountain situated roughly  north east of Blair Atholl in the Forest of Atholl in between Glen Tilt and Glen Loch, in Cairngorms National Park.

Details 
The mountain has patches of grey scree (see pictures) amongst grass, while heather grows quite profusely on the lower slopes and gives the hill a colourful skirt when in bloom in summer.

Flora and fauna 
It is a region of European dry heaths and there are many species of alpine and marsh plants on the mountain such as the rare yellow oxytropis (Oxytropis campestris), mountain avens (Dryas octopetala), rock speedwell (Veronica fruticans), rock sedge (Carex rupestris) and green spleenwort (Asplenium viride).

Human activity 
Beinn a’ Ghlò is a familiar sight to motorists travelling north along the A9 road at the Pass of Killiecrankie but this view only shows Càrn Liath. Beinn a’ Ghlò has nineteen corries and legend says that a rifle shot in any one cannot be heard in any of the others. Queen Victoria viewed the mountain in 1844 on a drive up Glen Tilt, saying, “We came upon a lovely view — Beinn a’ Ghlò straight before us — and under these high hills the River Tilt gushing and winding over stones and slates … and the air so pure and fine but no description can do it justice”.

There are two popular starting points for the traverse of the mountain. The first is at Loch Moraig (grid reference ) at the end of the minor road,  from Blair Atholl. The other is at Marble Lodge in Glen Tilt (grid reference ) but this requires permission from the Atholl Estate to drive the  up the private estate road. From Loch Moraig a track is followed to the foot of the mountain. It is a steep climb to the first Munro of Càrn Liath passing through white granite scree near the top. The return to Loch Moraig can be varied, going over the "top" of Airgiod Bheinn, which translates as Silver Mountain, before dropping into the valley and picking up the track; this avoids the need to re-ascend the first two Munros.

 Views 
Càrn Liath and Càrn nan Gabhar both have trig points and are excellent viewpoints. Càrn nan Gabhar has a panorama that includes the Cairngorms, the Glen Shee hills and an aerial view down into Glen Loch. Càrn Liath looks out over Blair Atholl towards the Scottish Lowlands.

Gaelic pronunciation
 Càrn Liath 
 Bràigh Coire Chruinn-bhalgain (Gaelic: Bràigh Coire a' Chruinn-bhalgain) 
 Càrn nan Gabhar 
 Airgiod Bheinn (Gaelic: Airgead-bheinn'')

See also 
 Ben Nevis
 List of Munro mountains
 Mountains and hills of Scotland

References 
 The Munros (SMC Guide) Donald Bennett et al., 
 100 Best Routes on Scottish Mountains, Ralph Storer, 
 The High Mountains of Britain and Ireland, Irvine Butterfield, 
 SSSI Info

Munros
Marilyns of Scotland
Mountains and hills of the Eastern Highlands
Mountains and hills of Perth and Kinross
Sites of Special Scientific Interest in East Perth
One-thousanders of Scotland